Phrygiopilus is a genus of crabs in the family Pseudothelphusidae, containing the following species:
 Phrygiopilus acanthophallus Smalley, 1970
 Phrygiopilus chuacusensis Smalley, 1970
 Phrygiopilus ibarrai (Pretzmann, 1978)
 Phrygiopilus longipes (Pretzmann, 1965)
 Phrygiopilus montebelloensis Alvarez & Villalobos, 1998
 Phrygiopilus strengerae (Pretzmann, 1965)
 Phrygiopilus yoshibensis Alvarez & Villalobos, 1998

References

Pseudothelphusidae